Rosa María Avilés Nájera (born 31 March 1951) is a Mexican politician affiliated with the Convergence (formerly to the Party of the Democratic Revolution). As of 2014 she served as Deputy of the LIX Legislature of the Mexican Congress as a plurinominal representative.

References

1951 births
Living people
People from Puebla (city)
Women members of the Chamber of Deputies (Mexico)
Members of the Chamber of Deputies (Mexico)
Party of the Democratic Revolution politicians
Citizens' Movement (Mexico) politicians
21st-century Mexican women politicians
21st-century Mexican politicians
Politicians from Puebla
Meritorious Autonomous University of Puebla alumni
Academic staff of the National Autonomous University of Mexico
Deputies of the LIX Legislature of Mexico